The American Decency Association (ADA) is a non-profit organization associated with the Christian right based in Fremont, Michigan. Its principal cause is against pornography and "indecent" media. The ADA was founded in 1999 by former elementary school teacher, Bill Johnson, the first-named state director of the American Family Association (AFA) from 1987 to 1999.  The organization was formerly known as the Michigan chapter of the AFA.

Activism

Detroit Pistons dancers
In 2006, the ADA opposed the distribution of a calendar depicting Detroit Pistons dance group, "Automotion" members in swimsuits. The calendar was given away to fans during a December basketball game, and then sold to legal adults for $13 in Pistons' stores. A member of the ADA described the calendar as "legalized prostitution." The ADA opposed the calendar by means of its e-mail newsletter, and said that since the basketball team counted women and young children among its fans, the calendar was inappropriate. The proceeds of the calendar went to charity.

In January 2006, Brother Rice High, a Michigan Catholic school disinvited Automotion to an alumni fundraising event after repeated urging by the ADA.  The ADA held that the event "legitimizes pornography and the objectification of women."  Though the high school's decision was made in response to public pressure instead of an admission of wrongdoing by the principal, the ADA still viewed it as a victory.  The dancers planned to donate their time to the fundraising event.

Supporters
The ADA receives some funding from the Holland, Michigan-based Prince Foundation (formerly the Edgar and Elsa Prince Foundation), which funds many other Christian right  groups including the Family Research Council and Focus on the Family, which each received a little over a million dollars in 2003 and 2004, and 2003 and 2005, respectively.  The Prince Foundation also gave money to the Promise Keepers, and the Concerned Women for America.  Many other local and national groups associated with the religious right have received money from the Edgar and Elsa Prince Foundation.

References

Non-profit organizations based in Michigan
Newaygo County, Michigan
Christian organizations based in the United States
Organizations established in 1999
Conservative organizations in the United States
1999 establishments in Michigan